Michel Jules Arthur Tromont (24 June 1937 – 9 July 2018) was a Belgian politician. A member of the Liberal Reformist Party, he was a deputy in the Chamber of Representatives from 1978 to 1983, serving as Minister of National Education from 1981 to 1983 and mayor of Quiévrain from 1977 to 1983. He was also Governor of the Hainaut province  from 1983 to 2004.

References

1937 births
2018 deaths
Governors of Hainaut (province)
Members of the Chamber of Representatives (Belgium)
People from Quiévrain
Mayors of places in Belgium
Liberal Reformist Party politicians